Konstantin Nikolayevich Derzhavin (in Batumi – 2 November 1956 in Leningrad) was a Russian Soviet literary and theater critic, translator, and writer. He wrote the libretto to Aram Khachaturian's ballet Gayane.  His wife was the ballerina Nina Aleksandrovna Anisimova.

References

Ballet librettists
Russian literary critics
People from Batumi
1903 births
1956 deaths
Soviet literary historians
Soviet male writers
20th-century Russian male writers
20th-century Russian translators